Joe Brown (May 18, 1926 – December 4, 1997) was an American professional boxer who won the world lightweight title in 1956, making 11 successful defenses against 10 contenders before losing his crown to Carlos Ortiz in 1962. Brown was a classic boxer and a knockout puncher. Known as the 'Creole Clouter' and Joe 'Old Bones' Brown, he was managed by Lou Viscusi and named The Ring's 'Fighter of the Year' for 1961. Brown was inducted into the Louisiana Sports Hall of Fame in 1978, the World Boxing Hall of Fame in 1987 and the International Boxing Hall of Fame in 1996.

Early life and career
Born into poverty in Baton Rouge, Louisiana, USA, on May 18, 1926, Brown started work as a grocery assistant, moved into carpentry and then embarked on his professional boxing career at the age of seventeen. He made his professional debut on January 15, 1943, at Victory Arena in New Orleans against Ringer Thompson, winning the four-round bout on points. Brown had another six fights, one of which was winning a four-round decision against Leonard Caesar on September 3, 1943, before he was drafted into the United States Navy during World War II. While in the Navy, Brown captured the All-Service Lightweight Championship before being honorably discharged from the Navy in 1945.

The resumption of Brown's career was initially disappointing and he frequently fought in undercard matches at Coliseum Arena or Pelican Stadium. One fight saw Brown suffering a third-round knock-out by Melvin Bartholomew in July 1945. After this fight, Brown did not fight again until January 1946, when he lost on a decision over five rounds to Leonard Caesar. Some reward came a mere seven days later when Brown out-pointed Johnny Monroe, but his career over the following three years was, at best, checkered.

The impetus for Brown's ultimate success seems to have been provided by a crushing defeat at the hands of the future National Boxing Association Welterweight Champion, Johnny Bratton, late in 1948, immediately followed by a short spell away from the ring. In 1949, Brown actually went unbeaten and, over the next seven years, he steadily climbed the Lightweight rankings, defeating along the way such notable boxers as Virgil Akins, Isaac Logart and Teddy 'Redtop' Davis.

These fruitful times were not, however, without their difficulties. The skilful Brown, standing a lanky 5 feet 7½ inches, with a long reach and solid left hand, came to be viewed as dangerous – too dangerous by some astute managers who frequently appeared to steer their charges away from meeting him. Several times, Brown quit in despair during his thirteen-year wait for a shot at the title.

World Champion
Brown earned his chance for the Lightweight Championship of the World by out-pointing the reigning champion, Wallace 'Bud' Smith in a non-title bout held in Houston, Texas, in May 1956. Four months later, on August 24 and in front of his home crowd at the Municipal Auditorium in New Orleans, Brown defeated Smith by way of a split decision over fifteen hard-fought rounds. Confirmation of Brown's superiority came early in the following year when, defending the Championship for the first time, he knocked Smith out in eleven rounds.

Once Champion, Brown hoped that his newly acquired status would confer the riches and popular recognition denied to him for so long. Yet, as George Gainford (manager of the charismatic and handsome Sugar Ray Robinson) noted, the name 'Joe Brown' was hardly inspirational. Realising this, Brown attempted to solve his problems by billing himself as Joe 'Old Bones' Brown. The gimmick worked and he became something of a draw for the remainder of his Championship career.

In all, Brown made eleven successful defences of his title against ten boxers, and remained Champion for almost six years. After demolishing Smith, Brown beat Orlando Zulueta, Joey Lopes, Ralph Dupas, Kenny Lane, Johnny Busso, Paolo Rosi, Cisco Andrade, Bert Somodio and Dave Charnley (twice). Brown's re-match with Charnley, was named The Ring's Fight of the Year for 1961.

Nemesis came in the form of the great Carlos Ortiz from Puerto Rico. Ortiz – intelligent, agile and ten years Brown's junior – stepped down from the Junior Welterweight division where he had been king until out-pointed by Duilio Loi, to focus on the richer pickings to be had amongst the world's top Lightweights. He met Brown in Las Vegas on April 21, 1962, and took the ageing Champion's title after fifteen lackluster rounds to begin his own lengthy domination of the division.

Beyond glory
Brown fought on for another eight years, before retiring in 1970, at the age of 44 with a record of 121 wins, 47 losses and 14 draws with 56 KOs. In reflecting on the close of Brown's career, Henry Cooper has written that there came to be "little pride left in his performances" as he tried to compensate "for all the hungry years when he had been forced to fight for peanuts" (Cooper, 1990). Joe Brown later became a trainer in New Orleans, Louisiana, and led some fighters to become professionals, such as Gregory E. Haines, of Slidell, Louisiana.

Joe Brown died in New Orleans, USA, on December 4, 1997.

Professional boxing record

See also
 Lineal championship
 List of lightweight boxing champions

References

External links

https://boxrec.com/media/index.php/National_Boxing_Association%27s_Quarterly_Ratings:_1956
https://boxrec.com/media/index.php/National_Boxing_Association%27s_Quarterly_Ratings:_1957
https://boxrec.com/media/index.php/National_Boxing_Association%27s_Quarterly_Ratings:_1958
https://boxrec.com/media/index.php/National_Boxing_Association%27s_Quarterly_Ratings:_1959
https://boxrec.com/media/index.php/National_Boxing_Association%27s_Quarterly_Ratings:_1960
https://boxrec.com/media/index.php/National_Boxing_Association%27s_Quarterly_Ratings:_1961
https://boxrec.com/media/index.php/National_Boxing_Association%27s_Quarterly_Ratings:_1962
https://www.wbaboxing.com/wba-history/world-boxing-association-history
 https://titlehistories.com/boxing/na/usa/ny/nysac-l.html

1926 births
1997 deaths
Lightweight boxers
African-American boxers
International Boxing Hall of Fame inductees
Sportspeople from Baton Rouge, Louisiana
American male boxers
Boxers from Louisiana
United States Navy personnel of World War II
African Americans in World War II
20th-century African-American sportspeople